Glymdrápa ("Drápa of din") is a skaldic poem composed by Þorbjörn Hornklofi, the court poet of King Harald I of Norway (Haraldr hárfagri). Composed toward the end of the 9th century, the poem recounts several battles waged by King Harald, mostly as he was uniting Norway.

Composed in dróttkvætt, only seven stanzas and two half-stanzas are preserved, chiefly in the Heimskringla (Haralds saga hárfagra). Glymdrápa is the oldest praise poem to a king (konungsdrápa) which has come down to us. The poem has few clear geographical or historical points of reference, and the two sagas which quote it, Heimskringla and Fagrskinna interpret it differently.

In Heimskringla, the poem is said to recount Harald's fight against the people of Orkdal at Oppdal forest (Uppdalsskógr),   first against Huntiof, King of Nordmøre (Húnþjófr), his son Solve Klove (Sölvi)  and his father-in-law King Nokkve  (Nökkvi), king of Romsdal; second against Sölvi and his allies Arnviðr, king of Sunnmøre, and Auðbjörn, who ruled over the Fjords in the districts of Nordfjord and Sunnfjord.
 Lastly Harald's  battles in Gotland and finally his expedition westwards to fight Vikings, which led him to the Isle of Man.

According to Fagrskinna's account, part of the poem relates events of the Battle of Hafrsfjord, the decisive battle in King Harald's unification of Norway.

See also
First battle of Solskjel
Second battle of Solskjel

References

Primary Sources
 Heimskringla: History of the Kings of Norway, translated Lee M. Hollander.(Austin: University of Texas Press, 1992) 
Fagrskinna: A Catalogue of the Kings of Norway, translated by Alison Finlay (Leiden: Brill Academic Publishers, 2004)

Other sources
 Boyer, Régis (1990) La Poésie scaldique. Paris: Éd. du Porte-glaive. .
 Faulkes, Anthony (ed.) (1998) Snorri Sturluson: Edda. Skáldskaparmál. Vol. 2, Glossary and Index of Names. London: Viking Society for Northern Research.

Related Reading
Krag, Claus (2000) Norges historie fram til 1319 (Universitetsforlaget)  (In Norwegian)

External links
 Two editions of Glymdrápa

Skaldic poems
Cultural depictions of Harald Fairhair